Patient Focus (PF) is a minor political party in Norway. It was formed in April 2021, as a support movement for an expansion of the Alta Hospital in Finnmark. In the 2021 parliamentary election, it won one of Finnmark's five seats in the Storting. The party's leader, Irene Ojala, holds the seat. Although the party is a single-issue party, it plans to utilize policies of direct democracy among the constituents it represents for its other policy positions.

See also
Hospital to Alta, a similar party which ran in the 2013 Norwegian election
Independent Kidderminster Hospital and Health Concern, a similar party in Kidderminster, England

References

Political parties in Norway
Single-issue political parties
Political parties established in 2021
2021 establishments in Norway
Regionalist parties
Political parties of minorities in Norway